Radha is an Indian actress who has appeared in the Tamil film industry. The actress won critical acclaim for her performance in Sundhara Travels (2002) and later appeared in other Tamil and Malayalam language films.

Career
Radha made her début in the comedy film Sundhara Travels (2002), after relocating from Andhra Pradesh to work as an actress. The film opened to average reviews and had a successful run at the box office, with the performances of her co-actors Murali and Vadivelu being praised. After the release of the film, Radha alleged that the film's producer S. V. Thangaraj had offered her a role in his next film if she slept with him, creating media attention. Radha then starred alongside Karthik in the long-delayed production Game (2002), before portraying small roles in the Sathyaraj-starrer Adavadi (2007) and Kathavarayan (2008), several years later. She later moved on to appear in television dramas such as Bhairavi (2012).

In November 2013, Radha lodged a complaint against entrepreneur Faizul, claiming that he had refused to marry her after a six-year live-in relationship and had threatened to make their private videos public. She further alleged that director Erode Soundar been an accessory to Faizul's wrongdoing. Within three weeks, she withdrew her complaint against Faizul.

In August 2016, Radha claimed that a gangster named Vairam from Puzhal Central Prison called and threatened her about her relationship with film producer, Munivel. She lodged a police complaint following the incident, though following her press statement, Munivel's wife came out and criticised the actress for damaging her relationship with her husband.

Filmography
Films

 Television
 2012 Bhairavi Aavigalukku Priyamanaval (Sun TV) - Bhairavi
 2023 - present Bharathi Kannamma 2 (Vijay TV) - Sharmila

References

Living people
Actresses in Tamil cinema
Indian film actresses
21st-century Indian actresses
Year of birth missing (living people)